is a Japanese manga series written and illustrated by Atsushi Ohkubo. It was serialized in Kodansha's shōnen manga magazine Weekly Shōnen Magazine from September 2015 to February 2022, with its chapters collected in 34 tankōbon volumes. In North America, the manga has been licensed for English language release by Kodansha USA.

An anime television series adaptation produced by David Production aired from July to December 2019 on the MBS's Super Animeism block. A second season aired from July to December 2020. A third season has been announced. The anime television series has been licensed by Funimation.

As of May 2022, the Fire Force manga had over 20 million copies in circulation, making it one of the best-selling manga series.

Synopsis

Setting
The  is an event that happened two hundred and fifty years ago, 50 years before the Solar year 0. During it, the world was set on fire, and many nations were wiped out with very few habitable areas left in the aftermath. The survivors took refuge in the Tokyo Empire, which remained mostly stable during the period despite losing some of its landmass. The Tokyo Emperor Raffles I establishes the faith of the Holy Sol Temple as it and Haijima Industries developed the perpetual thermal energy plant Amaterasu to power the country.

In Year 198 of Tokyo's Solar Era, special fire brigades called the Fire Force fight increasing incidents of spontaneous human combustion where human beings are turned into living infernos called  While the Infernals are first generation cases of spontaneous human combustion, with more powerful horned variations known as Demons, later generations possess pyrokinesis while retaining human form. The Fire Force was formed by combining people with these powers from the Holy Sol Temple, The Tokyo Armed Forces, and the Fire Defense Agency, and is composed of eight independent companies.

Plot
Shinra Kusakabe is a third generation pyrokinetic youth who gained the nickname "Devil's Footprints" for his ability to ignite his feet at will, and was ostracized as a child for the fire that killed his mother and younger brother Sho twelve years ago. He joins Special Fire Force Company 8, which features other pyrokinetics who dedicated themselves to ending the Infernal attacks for good while investigating Companies 1 through 7 for potential corruption in their ranks. Shinra begins to learn that the fire that killed his mother was a cover for Sho to be taken by the White Clad, a doomsday cult behind the Infernal attacks with agents within the facets of the Tokyo Empire. Company 8 and their allies oppose the White Clad while learning of their goal to gather eight individuals like Shinra and Sho to repeat the Great Cataclysm for an ancient being who manipulated humanity for that very purpose.

Media

Manga

Fire Force, written and illustrated by Atsushi Ohkubo, was serialized in Kodansha's shōnen manga magazine Weekly Shōnen Magazine from September 23, 2015, to February 22, 2022. In the final chapter, it is hinted that Fire Force is connected to Ohkubo's other manga series Soul Eater. Kodansha collected its chapters in thirty-four tankōbon volumes, released from February 17, 2016, to May 17, 2022.

The series is licensed for English release in North America by Kodansha USA, which published the first volume on November 8, 2016.

Anime

An anime television series adaptation by studio David Production was announced on November 14, 2018. The series was directed by Yuki Yase, with Gakuto Haijima handling the series' scripts, Hideyuki Morioka designing the characters and Kenichiro Suehiro composing the music. The series aired from July 6 to December 28, 2019 on MBS and TBS as part of the Super Animeism block. It ran for 24 episodes. Due to the Kyoto Animation arson attack on July 18, 2019, Episode 3, which was originally scheduled to air on July 19, 2019, was postponed to July 26, 2019. The second opening theme is "MAYDAY" by Coldrain feat. Ryo from Crystal Lake from their album The Side Effects and the second ending is "Nо̄nai" by Lenny code fiction.

A second season was announced in December 2019, and it aired from July 4 to December 12, 2020. In May 2020, a promotional video for the second season was released. The second season was directed by Tatsuma Minamikawa (replacing Yuki Yase from the previous season). The second season ran for 24 episodes. The first opening theme is "SPARK-AGAIN", performed by Aimer, while the first ending theme is "ID", performed by Cider Girl. The second opening theme is "Torch of Liberty", performed by Kana-Boon, while the second ending theme is "Desire", performed by Pelican Fanclub.

A third season was announced in May 2022.

Funimation has licensed the series for streaming on FunimationNow. The series was simulcast in Southeast Asia on Aniplus Asia. On July 19, 2019, it was announced that Funimation's English dub of the series would premiere on Adult Swim's Toonami programming block on July 28, 2019. The second season premiered on Toonami on November 8, 2020, two weeks later than its original scheduled date.

Stage plays
In 2020, a stage-play adaptation of the series ran from July 31 to August 2 at the Umeda Arts Theater in Osaka and from August 7 to August 9 at KT Zepp Yokohama in Kanagawa. The play was directed by Sho Kubota, script written by Yusei Naruse, and music composed by Masaki Miyoshi; the protagonist Shinra Kusakabe was played by Hikaru Makishima. In 2022, a second stage-play ran from January 18–23 at KT Zepp Yokohama and from January 27–30 at the Sankei Hall Breeze in Osaka; it featured the same staff and Makishima reprised his role as Shinra.

Video game
In May 2022, an original video game titled Fire Force: Enbu no Shō was announced. Mrs. Green Apple will perform the game's theme song "En En".

Reception
As of January 2018, the manga had 1.8 million copies in circulation; 7.3 million copies in circulation as of June 2020; 10 million copies in circulation as of July 2020; 12 million copies in circulation as of October 2020; 15 million copies in circulation as of April 2021; 16 million copies in circulation as of June 2021; 17.5 million copies in circulation as of February 2022; and over 20 million copies in circulation as of May 2022.

The series ranked 13th on the "Nationwide Bookstore Employees' Recommended Comics of 2017" poll by Honya Club online bookstore. Gadget Tsūshin listed the prayer for Infernals, "Látom", on their 2019 most popular anime-related buzzwords list. On TV Asahi's Manga Sōsenkyo 2021 poll, in which 150.000 people voted for their top 100 manga series, Fire Force ranked 84th. The manga was nominated for the 45th Kodansha Manga Award in the shōnen category in 2021.

Notes

References

External links
 
 
 

 

2019 anime television series debuts
Adventure anime and manga
Anime series based on manga
Animeism
Dark fantasy anime and manga
David Production
Firefighting in fiction
Funimation
Kodansha manga
Mainichi Broadcasting System original programming
Science fantasy anime and manga
Shōnen manga
Spontaneous human combustion in fiction
Television series about firefighting
TBS Television (Japan) original programming
Toonami
Upcoming anime television series